University of Bristol Hockey Club is a field hockey club that is based at the University of Bristol, the club plays at the Coombe Dingle Sports Complex on Coombe Lane in Bristol.

The club runs six men's teams with the first XI playing in the Men's England Hockey League Division One South  and seven women's teams with the first XI playing in the Premiership of the West Hockey League. 

Both the men's and women's teams also compete in the British Universities and Colleges Sport South Premier.

References

English field hockey clubs
Sport in Bristol